Cai Zhong Hu (Chinese: , lit. "Hu, Elder of Cai"), born Ji Hu, was the only known son of Ji Du, the first lord of Cai.

Ji Du was removed from his office after participating in the Rebellion of the Three Guards against the regency of the Duke of Zhou. However, his son made an effort to get his manners straight and be kind to people and was sent by the Duke of Zhou to Lu as an ambassador. Following this, King Cheng restored his father's fief to him and his son inherited it after him.

References

Zhou dynasty nobility
Cai (state)
11th-century BC Chinese monarchs